This is a list of Time Team episodes from series 2.

Episode

Series 2

Episode # refers to the air date order. The Time Team Specials are aired in between regular episodes, but are omitted from this list. Regular contributors on Time Team include: Tony Robinson (presenter); Mick Aston, Phil Harding, Carenza Lewis, Mark Horton (archaeologists); Robin Bush (historian); Victor Ambrus (illustrator); Stewart Ainsworth (landscape investigator); John Gater, Chris Gaffney (geophysics).

References

External links
Time Team at Channel4.com
The Unofficial Time Team site Fan site

Time Team (Series 02)
1995 British television seasons